Port Moody-Coquitlam is a provincial electoral district in British Columbia, Canada established by the Electoral Districts Act, 2008.  It was first contested in the 2009 general election in which BC Liberal Iain Black was elected as its MLA. Black resigned effective October 3, 2011, so he could accept a job as the president and CEO of the Vancouver Board of Trade.

Member of Legislative Assembly

Election results

References

British Columbia provincial electoral districts
Politics of Coquitlam
Port Moody
Provincial electoral districts in Greater Vancouver and the Fraser Valley